The 1982–83 Norwegian 1. Divisjon season was the 44th season of ice hockey in Norway. Ten teams participated in the league, and Furuset IF won the championship.

Regular season

Playoffs

Relegation 
 Rosenborg IHK - Storhamar Dragons 0:2 (2:8, 2:4)

External links 
 Norwegian Ice Hockey Federation

Nor
GET-ligaen seasons
1982 in Norwegian sport
1983 in Norwegian sport